Acacia alaticaulis is a shrub to tree of the genus Acacia and the subgenus Botrycephalae that is native to eastern Australia.

Description
It blooms from December to May and produces cream-white inflorescences.

Distribution
It is endemic to an area in eastern New South Wales where it has a restricted range around Howes Mountain area and around Mount Murwin and the Yengo National Park area where it is commonly situated on hillslopes and ridges among and over sandstone bedrock or outcrops or where areas of shale meet sandstones. It is found growing in sandy to sandy clay soils as a part of Eucalyptus woodlands or open forest communities as a part of the shrub understorey.

See also
 List of Acacia species

References

alaticaulis
Flora of New South Wales
Taxa named by Mary Tindale
Plants described in 2013